The South African Railways Class 3B 4-8-2 of 1912 was a steam locomotive.

In 1912, the South African Railways took delivery of ten Class 3B steam locomotives with a 4-8-2 Mountain type wheel arrangement which had been ordered by the Natal Government Railways the year before.

Manufacturer
With the experience gained from the sole experimental Class B American D locomotive, Natal Government Railways (NGR) Locomotive Superintendent D.A. Hendrie redesigned his Class Hendrie D and placed orders for ten locomotives with the North British Locomotive Company on 29 March 1911. These locomotives, which would have become the NGR's Class Superheated Hendrie D, were built in two batches of five and were all delivered in 1912 after the renumbering and reclassification of the locomotives of the constituent former Colonial railways into the South African Railways (SAR). Upon delivery, they were therefore taken directly onto the SAR roster, numbered in the range from 1479 to 1488 and designated Class 3B. The first of these engines entered service in February 1912.

Characteristics
Like the NGR Class Hendrie D which it was based on and which was later designated the SAR Class 3, the Class 3B had plate frames, Walschaerts valve gear and Belpaire fireboxes. They were the first of Hendrie's designs to have superheaters and, as a result, piston valves instead of slide valves. They also sported a new design of leading bogie with cast-steel framing and three-point suspension links.

To accommodate the redesigned cylinders and the necessary alteration to the Walschaerts valve gear, the running boards had to be raised to clear the steam chests and motion. This resulted in the gentle sweeps at either end where the running boards dropped down to the buffer beam and below the cab. These curves became a Hendrie hallmark and enhanced the appear­ance of the locomotive. In other respects, however, they were practically identical to the Class 3.

The locomotives were delivered with Type TM tenders with an  coal capacity and a  water capacity. The engines, as built, had flangeless wheels on the leading coupled axle, but these were subsequently also flanged as shown in official SAR dimensional locomotive drawings.

The superheated Class 3B 4-8-2 Mountain type became the forerunner of the most numerous basic type of steam locomotive to be used in South Africa.

Watson Standard boilers
In the 1930s, many serving locomotives were reboilered with a standard boiler type designed by then Chief Mechanical Engineer (CME) A.G. Watson as part of his standardisation policy. Such Watson Standard reboilered locomotives were reclassified by adding an "R" suffix to their classification.

Their original Belpaire boilers were fitted with Ramsbottom safety valves, while the Watson Standard boiler was fitted with Pop safety valves. Probably at the same time, their Type TM tenders were rebuilt to the more attractive smooth-sided Type TL tenders. The most obvious visual difference between an original and a Watson Standard reboilered locomotive is usually a rectangular regulator cover just to the rear of the chimney on the reboilered locomotive. In the case of the Class 3BR locomotive, an even more obvious visual distinction is the absence of the Belpaire firebox hump between the cab and the boiler.

Service

South African Railways
The Class 3B was placed in service on the upper section of the Natal mainline. They were later also used in the Eastern Transvaal and the Eastern Cape. Towards the end of their service lives, they ended up in Cape Town, where they were used as shunting engines until the last ones were withdrawn from SAR service by 1976.

Industrial
Most of them ended up in service on South Africa's coal and gold mines. Only one of them had been withdrawn by April 1973. At the time when the other nine began to be withdrawn from railway service, the world oil crisis of the mid-1970s had erupted and all nine were virtually snapped up by industrial users responding to the South African Government's call to save oil by using alternative sources of energy. Ironically, at the same time, the State-owned SAR was replacing steam with diesel-electric locomotives.

The ten individual locomotives were disposed of as follows:
 No. 1479 was scrapped by 1973 and not sold.
 No. 1480 went to Vaal Reefs at Orkney as no. 4.
 No. 1481 went to Landau Colliery at Witbank as no. 3 and was eventually staged at Landau for the South African National Railway And Steam Museum (SANRASM).
 No. 1482 went to Western Holdings as no. 7 and later to Freegold North as no. 8.
 No. 1483 went to Blesbok Colliery as no. 3, later to Springbok Colliery and was eventually staged at ESKOM's Komati Power Station for SANRASM.
 No. 1484 went to Springbok Colliery as Hope, then to Southern Cross Steel, then to Umgala Colliery as no. 8 and was eventually staged by SANRASM at Krugersdorp.
 No. 1485 went to Free State Saaiplaas Gold Mine as no. 1 and was eventually staged at Odendaalsrus.
 No. 1486 went to Western Holdings as no. 5, later to Umgala Colliery, and was eventually acquired by Umgeni Steam Railway at Pinetown and restored as their engine Maureen.
 No. 1487 went to Free State Geduld as no. 5, later to Freegold North as no. 9 and was eventually staged at Odendaalsrus.
 No. 1488 went to Vaal Reefs at Orkney as no. 5.

Preservation
Two 3B class survive.

Illustration
The main picture shows Umgeni Steam Railway's Class 3BR no. 1486 Maureen at Kloof station on 6 June 2010, while the following show the Class in its original as-delivered SAR livery and in two of the mining liveries which were applied to it while in industrial service.

References

1250
1250
1250
4-8-2 locomotives
2D1 locomotives
NBL locomotives
Cape gauge railway locomotives
Railway locomotives introduced in 1912
1912 in South Africa